Potter Township is a township in Centre County, Pennsylvania, United States. It is part of the State College, Pennsylvania Metropolitan Statistical Area. The population was 3,614 at the 2020 census.

History
Located in Potter Township are the following sites on the National Register of Historic Places: Andrew Gregg Homestead, Egg Hill Church, Maj. John Neff Homestead, Neff Round Barn, Leonard Rhone House, Potter-Allison Farm, and Daniel Waggoner Log House and Barn.

Geography

Potter Township is bordered by Benner, Spring and Walker townships to the north, Gregg Township to the east, Mifflin and Huntingdon counties to the south, and Harris Township to the west. The township also surrounds the separate borough of Centre Hall and is part of the Penns Valley region of Centre County.

Demographics

As of the census of 2000, there were 3,339 people, 1,267 households, and 952 families residing in the township.  The population density was 57.5 people per square mile (22.2/km).  There were 1,467 housing units at an average density of 25.2/sq mi (9.7/km).  The racial makeup of the township was 98.71% White, 0.39% African American, 0.15% Native American, 0.18% Asian, 0.03% Pacific Islander, 0.21% from other races, and 0.33% from two or more races. Hispanic or Latino of any race were 0.45% of the population.

There were 1,267 households, out of which 31.3% had children under the age of 18 living with them, 65.8% were married couples living together, 5.9% had a female householder with no husband present, and 24.8% were non-families. 20.4% of all households were made up of individuals, and 8.3% had someone living alone who was 65 years of age or older.  The average household size was 2.54 and the average family size was 2.94.

In the township the population was spread out, with 26.0% under the age of 18, 6.1% from 18 to 24, 29.0% from 25 to 44, 27.3% from 45 to 64, and 11.7% who were 65 years of age or older.  The median age was 39 years. For every 100 females, there were 98.5 males.  For every 100 females age 18 and over, there were 100.7 males.

The median income for a household in the township was $43,556, and the median income for a family was $50,000. Males had a median income of $36,571 versus $23,781 for females. The per capita income for the township was $21,320.  About 7.0% of families and 8.1% of the population were below the poverty line, including 8.4% of those under age 18 and 8.2% of those age 65 or over.

References

External links
Potter Township official website

Populated places established in 1774
Townships in Centre County, Pennsylvania
1774 establishments in Pennsylvania
Townships in Pennsylvania